Rocking the Boat is a non-profit organization in The Bronx, New York City.  They run educational programs for high school students, teaching boat building, environmental science, and sailing, with the goal of empowering economically disadvantaged young people in the South Bronx.  An annual fund-raising event features rowing around Manhattan.

History and activities 
Rocking the Boat was founded in 1996 by Adam Green, and is a non-profit organization in the South Bronx which runs STEM-based educational programs for local high school students.  They are most well known for boatbuilding, but curricula also include environmental science and sailing. Their motto is, "Kids don’t just build boats, boats build kids".

Originally located in a East Harlem junior high school, the group's first project was to build an  wooden dinghy, with the school's indoor swimming pool serving as a testing tank.  The organization is currently located in a converted warehouse on Edgewater Road in the Hunts Point section of The Bronx, adjacent to Hunts Point Riverside Park on the Bronx River.

As part of their environmental programs, Rocking the Boat does water quality testing in the Bronx River, measuring pathogen levels.  In 2002, Rocking the Boat worked with New York City Parks and The Bronx River Alliance to plant Spartina alterniflora (salt-marsh grass) along the shore of the Bronx River.

Students 

Rocking the Boat draws students mostly from the surrounding Hunts Point neighborhood, in the lowest income congressional district in the country.  Green told the Daily News, "Rocking the Boat empowers young people challenged by severe economic, educational and social conditions to develop the self-confidence to set ambitious goals and gain the skills necessary to achieve".

, approximately 850 students had graduated the organization's educational programs.

Rocking Manhattan 
Rocking the Boat runs an annual fundraising event, known as Rocking Manhattan, in which participants row wooden Whitehall rowing gigs around the island of Manhattan.  The , 8-hour course starts at Pier 40 on West Houston Street, circumnavigating the island via the East River, the Harlem River, and the Hudson River.  Recent events have included 12 boats and over 100 rowers.

References 

Non-profit organizations based in the Bronx
1996 establishments in New York City
Sailing in New York City
Youth empowerment organizations
Circumnavigations of Manhattan
Environmental organizations based in New York City